was a town located in Ibo District, Hyōgo Prefecture, Japan.

As of 2003, the town had an estimated population of 11,966 and a density of 665.89 persons per km2. The total area was 17.97 km2.

On October 1, 2005, Mitsu, along with the towns of Ibogawa and Shingū (all from Ibo District), was merged into the expanded city of Tatsuno.

Dissolved municipalities of Hyōgo Prefecture
Tatsuno, Hyōgo